The 2000 ATP Buenos Aires was an ATP Challenger Series tennis tournament held in Buenos Aires, Argentina. The tournament was held from November 20 to November 27.

Finals

Singles
 Guillermo Coria defeated  Alberto Berasategui 6–1, 4–6, 6–4

Doubles
 Pablo Albano /  Lucas Arnold Ker defeated  Sergio Roitman /  Andrés Schneiter 6–3, 4–6, 6–2

External links 
 International Tennis Federation (ITF) tournament edition details

 
ATP Buenos Aires
November 2000 sports events in South America